The Green Line, also known as the Education Line, is a rapid transit line of the Doha Metro in Qatar's capital city of Doha. Opened to the public on 10 December 2019, it runs east-to-west, beginning at Al Mansoura and terminating at the Al Riffa station on Dukhan Highway in Rawdat Al Jahhaniya. Part of the line runs underground, part of it runs at grade (ground level) and part of it is elevated on viaducts. Currently, the line has 11 stations, but will expand to 31 stations spread over 65.3 km in the future.

Stations

References

Doha Metro
Rapid transit in Qatar
2019 establishments in Qatar
Railway lines opened in 2019